Psydoll are a Japanese cyberpunk band. They formed in Tokyo in 1997 and incorporate industrial and electropop with cyberpunk imagery, musical and lyrical content. In 2003, they came to the UK to play at the Beyond the Veil gothic music festival in Leeds and gained some recognition amongst the UK industrial and gothic underground. Later that year they returned for a mini-tour of Scotland and Northern England. Leeds based Label Planet Ghost Music, recognized the talent and signed them for their first release outside Japan. I, Psydoll is a collection of their previous two albums plus a bonus track. They then returned to the UK in 2005 for another mini-tour supporting amongst others Amen.

Personnel

 Nekoi PSYDOLL (aka Rutoto Nekoi) (Vocals, Keyboards, Songs and lyrics)
 Ucchi PSYDOLL (Guitars, Arrangements and Programming)
 Loveless PSYDOLL (Actual name: Yoshinori Uenoyama) (Digital Percussion and Drums)

Discography

Albums

Singles and EPs

 Fragments (Japan only) (2003)
 Sign (Japan only) (2004)
 Stories (Japan only EP) (2005)
 Dance with PSYDOLL (2008)
 Silent Insanity (2014)
 Machine Sword: Chapter 1 of Machine Kingdom (2015)
 Machine Wand: Chapter 2 of Machine Kingdom (2016)
 Machine Disk: Chapter 3 of Machine Kingdom (2017)
 Machine Cup: Chapter 4 of Machine Kingdom (2018)
 Rebirth (2020)
 Psyberdoll Resurrections (2021)

Nekoi PSYDOLL's Book

 Moshi Moshi Call もしもしコール By Nekoi Rutoto 猫井るとと (Published by Kubo Shoten 久保書店 on 1985 October 1.) This 116 page book of Nekoi's comic strips, from the early to mid 1980s, is a collection of her work from Lemon People, Melon Comic, and other monthly manga magazines that she contributed to. A photo of her appears on the inside back flap of the dust jacket.

References

External links
 Official Website
 Psydoll's Myspace page
 Planetghost Music
 Psydoll | JGoth.com :: Japan Goth and Industrial Music

Cyberpunk music
Japanese electronic music groups
Japanese industrial music groups
Musical groups from Tokyo